The Convent of Nossa Senhora da Conceição is a former convent situated in the civil parish of Sé, in the historic centre of the municipality of Angra do Heroísmo, in the Portuguese archipelago of the Azores.

History 
The Gracianos were initially installed at the site, establishing a hermitage around 1584, before moving on in 1607 to the more central location of Alto das Covas.

Pedro Cardoso Machado, third nephew of Gonçalo Eanes, bought the land and buildings at the site for 160,000 réis on 16 February. An emigrant from the Spanish West Indies, Machado wished to return to the island of Terceira and found a convent for his sister, Simoa da Anunciação, making her an abbess for life. Encountering difficulties with the ecclesiastical authorities in Praia, he obtained a papal bull from Pope Paul V (on 5 August 1606) to establish the monastery for the Order of Our Lady of the Conception in Angra.

The convent began to operate on 11 April 1608, with nine nuns arriving on 13 April, but at its height, the convent sheltered 63 nuns.

The Conceptionist convent was one of nine such monastic institutions on the island of Terceira, as later identified by Father António Cordeiro, in his História Insulana das Ilhas a Portugal Sujeytas no Oceano Occidental:
"The seventh convent, is commonly known as the Conceptionist Nuns' [convent], to distinguish it from the Clerics' Conceptionist College. It was this convent, whose stature and singular and perfect purpose they say, that in Portugal, there is only one similar in the east".

On 24 July 1830, the Maria Josefa do Desterro was elected abadess, ultimately, the last Conceptionist prelate in Angra. On 20 January 1832, the Regency of Angra ordered that convent be cleared into order to transform the spaces into a military hospital. D. Pedro IV, by decree dated 2 April 1833, ceded to the Santa Casa da Misericórdia the buildings in order to install the Hospital de Santo Espírito making the nuns orderlies and nurses. Following the extinction of religious orders and administrative reforms by the Marquess of Pombal, in 1834, the remaining clergy from the Convent of Santo Espírito were transferred to the site.

The building was damaged during the events of the 1 January 1980 Azores earthquake. There were a number of projects to demolish the site, but since 1984, many of them included the partial or complete preservation or restoration of the ruined structure. The regional government ultimately classified the ruins on 9 September 2004, including it in the historical classification for Angra.

References

Notes

Sources
 
 
 

Buildings and structures in Angra do Heroísmo
Nossa Senhora Conceica Angra
1606 establishments in Portugal